Alvar is a village in the Amasia Municipality of the Shirak Province of Armenia.

History 
Some of the ancestors of the village population emigrated from Western Armenia in 1828-1830. The village was mostly populated by Azerbaijanis. In 1988-1989, during the Nagorno-Karabakh conflict, local Azeris moved to Azerbaijan, and Armenian families resettled in the village.

Demographics 
The Statistical Committee of Armenia reported the community's population was 168 in 2010, up from 147 at the 2001 census. As of January 2013, the villages' population is 243.

The population of the village since 1886 is as follows:

References 

Communities in Shirak Province
Populated places in Shirak Province